Federal Governmental Institution — penal colony No. 18 of the Federal Penitentiary Service of Russia in Yamalo-Nenets Autonomous Okrug, commonly known as the Polar Owl (Polyarnaya sova) is a Russian prison located on the bank of the Sob River near the Polar Urals in the Kharp urban-type settlement. It is one of the seven supermax corrective labor colonies operated by the Federal Penitentiary Service for convicts sentenced to life imprisonment in Russia.

History 
Kharp was founded in 1961 during the construction of the Salekhard–Igarka Railway. The core of the new settlement was a camp for prisoners who worked on laying the railway. Subsequently, the camp was transformed into a prison for particularly dangerous recidivists. The prison received the status of a colony for life convicts in 2004.

In 2010–2012, there were reports in the media that some employees of the colony were involved in a scandal with the falsification of confession. Some unscrupulous guards were suspected of beating testimonies from prisoners with the use of physical and psychological violence. Novaya Gazeta reported 190 fake turnouts, while Izvestia reported 32 fake turnouts. According to Novaya Gazeta, the Federal Penitentiary Service for the Yamalo-Nenets Autonomous Okrug tried to hush up the case, since high-ranking officials could be involved in it.

Notable inmates
The Polar Owl has housed numerous serial killers:
Alexander Elistratov (born 1954) - made an unsuccessful escape attempt in 2011 
Alexander Greba (born 1980)
Yevgeny Kolesnikov (1984-2016) - killed himself at the colony
Sergey Osipenko (born 1970)
Ivan Panchenko (born 1968)
Alexander Pichushkin (born 1974)
Dmitry Voronenko (born 1971)
Mikhail Alexandrovich Yudin (born 1975)
Abdufatto Zamanov (born 1973)
Sergey Zastynchanu (born 1979)
Alexander Zhizhich (born 1979) - one half a killing team with his brother

References

Prisons in Russia
1961 establishments in Russia